Charles d'Évreux (1305 – 5 September 1336) was the son of Louis, Count of Évreux and Margaret of Artois.

From his father, he inherited the lordship of Étampes, which was made a county in 1327.

He married Maria de La Cerda y de Lara, the daughter of Fernando de la Cerda, in April 1335 at Poissy. They had two children:
 Louis I, Count of Étampes
 John (1336 – aft. 1373, Rome)

Notes

Sources

1305 births
1336 deaths
Evreux, Charles of
Charles
14th-century peers of France